is a concept referring to business activities that continuously improve all functions and involve all employees from the CEO to the assembly line workers. Kaizen also applies to processes, such as purchasing and logistics, that cross organizational boundaries into the supply chain. It has been applied in healthcare, psychotherapy, life coaching, government, and banking.

By improving standardized programs and processes, kaizen aims to eliminate waste and redundancies (lean manufacturing). Kaizen was first practiced in Japanese businesses after World War II, influenced in part by American business and quality-management teachers, and most notably as part of The Toyota Way. It has since spread throughout the world and has been applied to environments outside of business and productivity.

Overview 
The Japanese word  means 'change for better' (from 改 kai - change, revision; and 善 zen - virtue, goodness) with the inherent meaning of either 'continuous' or 'philosophy' in Japanese dictionaries and in everyday use. The word refers to any improvement, one-time or continuous, large or small, in the same sense as the English word improvement. However, given the common practice in Japan of labeling industrial or business improvement techniques with the word kaizen, particularly the practices spearheaded by Toyota, the word kaizen in English is typically applied to measures for implementing continuous improvement, especially those with a "Japanese philosophy". The discussion below focuses on such interpretations of the word, as frequently used in the context of modern management discussions. Two kaizen approaches have been distinguished:

Point kaizen
Point kaizen is one of the most commonly implemented types of kaizen. It happens very quickly and usually without much planning. As soon as something is found broken or incorrect, quick and immediate measures are taken to correct the issues. These measures are generally small, isolated and easy to implement.; however, they can have a huge impact.

In some cases, it is also possible that the positive effects of point kaizen in one area can reduce or eliminate benefits of point kaizen in some other area.

Examples of point kaizen include a shop inspection by a supervisor who finds broken materials or other small issues, and then asks the owner of the shop to perform a quick kaizen (5S) to rectify those issues, or a line worker who notices a potential improvement in efficiency by placing the materials needed in another order or closer to the production line in order to minimize downtime.

System kaizen 
System kaizen is accomplished in an organized manner and is devised to address system-level problems in an organization.

It is an upper-level strategic planning method for a short period of time.

Line kaizen
Line kaizen refers to communication of improvements between the upstream and downstream of a process. This can be extended in several ways.

Plane kaizen 
This is the next upper level of line kaizen, in that several lines are connected together. In modern terminologies, this can also be described as a value stream, where instead of traditional departments, the organization is structured into product lines or families and value streams. It can be visualized as changes or improvements made to one line being implemented to multiple other lines or processes.

Cube kaizen 
Cube kaizen describes the situation where all the points of the planes are connected to each other and no point is disjointed from any other. This would resemble a situation where Lean has spread across the entire organization. Improvements are made up and down through the plane, or upstream or downstream, including the complete organization, suppliers and customers. This might require some changes in the standard business processes as well.

Benefits and tradeoffs 
Kaizen is a daily process, the purpose of which goes beyond simple productivity improvement. It is also a process that, when done correctly, humanizes the workplace, eliminates overly hard work (muri), and teaches people how to perform experiments on their work using the scientific method and how to learn to spot and eliminate waste in business processes. In all, the process suggests a humanized approach to workers and to increasing productivity: "The idea is to nurture the company's people as much as it is to praise and encourage participation in kaizen activities." Successful implementation requires "the participation of workers in the improvement."
People at all levels of an organization participate in kaizen, from the CEO down to janitorial staff, as well as external stakeholders when applicable. Kaizen is most commonly associated with manufacturing operations, as at Toyota, but has also been used in non-manufacturing environments. The format for kaizen can be individual, suggestion system, small group, or large group. At Toyota, it is usually a local improvement within a workstation or local area and involves a small group in improving their own work environment and productivity. This group is often guided through the kaizen process by a line supervisor; sometimes this is the line supervisor's key role. Kaizen on a broad, cross-departmental scale in companies, generates total quality management, and frees human efforts through improving productivity using machines and computing power.

While kaizen (at Toyota) usually delivers small improvements, the culture of continual aligned small improvements and standardization yields large results in terms of overall improvement in productivity. This philosophy differs from the "command and control" improvement programs (e.g., Business Process Improvement) of the mid-20th century. Kaizen methodology includes making changes and monitoring results, then adjusting. Large-scale pre-planning and extensive project scheduling are replaced by smaller experiments, which can be rapidly adapted as new improvements are suggested.

In modern usage, it is designed to address a particular issue over the course of a week and is referred to as a "kaizen blitz" or "kaizen event". These are limited in scope, and issues that arise from them are typically used in later blitzes. A person who makes a large contribution in the successful implementation of kaizen during kaizen events is awarded the title of "Zenkai". In the 21st century, business consultants in various countries have engaged in widespread adoption and sharing of the kaizen framework as a way to help their clients restructure and refocus their business processes.

History

The small-step work improvement approach was developed in the USA under Training Within Industry program (TWI Job Methods). Instead of encouraging large, radical changes to achieve desired goals, these methods recommended that organizations introduce small improvements, preferably ones that could be implemented on the same day. The major reason was that during WWII there was neither time nor resources for large and innovative changes in the production of war equipment. The essence of the approach came down to improving the use of the existing workforce and technologies.

As part of the Marshall Plan after World War II, American occupation forces brought in experts to help with the rebuilding of Japanese industry while the Civil Communications Section (CCS) developed a management training program that taught statistical control methods as part of the overall material. Homer Sarasohn and Charles Protzman developed and taught this course in 1949–1950. Sarasohn recommended W. Edwards Deming for further training in statistical methods.

The Economic and Scientific Section (ESS) group was also tasked with improving Japanese management skills and Edgar McVoy was instrumental in bringing Lowell Mellen to Japan to properly install the Training Within Industry (TWI) programs in 1951. The ESS group had a training film to introduce TWI's three "J" programs: Job Instruction, Job Methods and Job Relations. Titled "Improvement in Four Steps", it thus introduced kaizen to Japan.

For the pioneering, introduction, and implementation of kaizen in Japan, the Emperor of Japan awarded the Order of the Sacred Treasure to Dr. Deming in 1960. Subsequently, the Union of Japanese Scientists and Engineers (JUSE) instituted the annual Deming Prizes for achievement in quality and dependability of products. On October 18, 1989, JUSE awarded the Deming Prize to Florida Power & Light Co. (FPL), based in the US, for its exceptional accomplishments in process and quality-control management, making it the first company outside Japan to win the Deming Prize.

Kaoru Ishikawa took up this concept to define how continuous improvement or kaizen can be applied to processes, as long as all the variables of the process are known.

Implementation
The Toyota Production System is known for kaizen, where all line personnel are expected to stop their moving production line in case of any abnormality and, along with their supervisor, suggest an improvement to resolve the abnormality which may initiate a kaizen.

The cycle of kaizen activity can be defined as: Plan → Do → Check → Act. This is also known as the Shewhart cycle, Deming cycle, or PDCA.

Another technique used in conjunction with PDCA is the five whys, which is a form of root cause analysis in which the user asks a series of five "why" questions about a failure that has occurred, basing each subsequent question on the answer to the previous. There are normally a series of causes stemming from one root cause, and they can be visualized using fishbone diagrams or tables. The five whys can be used as a foundational tool in personal improvement, or as a means to create wealth.

Masaaki Imai made the term famous in his book Kaizen: The Key to Japan's Competitive Success.

In the Toyota Way Fieldbook, Liker and Meier discuss the kaizen blitz and kaizen burst (or kaizen event) approaches to continuous improvement. A kaizen blitz, or rapid improvement, is a focused activity on a particular process or activity. The basic concept is to identify and quickly remove waste. Another approach is that of the kaizen burst, a specific kaizen activity on a particular process in the value stream. Kaizen facilitators generally go through training and certification before attempting a kaizen project.

In the 1990s, Professor Iwao Kobayashi published his book 20 Keys to Workplace Improvement and created a practical, step-by-step improvement framework called "the 20 Keys". He identified 20 operations focus areas which should be improved to attain holistic and sustainable change. He went further and identified the five levels of implementation for each of these 20 focus areas. Four of the focus areas are called Foundation Keys. According to the 20 Keys, these foundation keys should be launched ahead of the others in order to form a strong constitution in the company. The four foundation keys are:

 Key 1 – Cleaning and Organizing to Make Work Easy, which is based on the 5S methodology. 
 Key 2 – Goal Alignment/Rationalizing the System
 Key 3 – Small Group Activities
 Key 4 – Leading and Site Technology

See also

Business process re-engineering
Experiential learning
Hansei
Kaikaku
Kanban, Kanban Method
Management fad
Mottainai, a sense of regret concerning waste
Muda (Japanese term)
Overall equipment effectiveness
Quality circle
Six Sigma
Statistical process control
Theory of constraints
Total productive maintenance
TRIZ, the theory of inventive problem solving
Visual control
Ikigai

References

Further reading

External links 

 Toyota stumbles but its "kaizen" cult endures, Reuters
 Warping Forward with Kaizen, Karn G. Bulsuk
 Kaizen Glossary, Joe Marshall
 Guide to Kaizen startup Best Practice Guide, Ben Geck
 Definition of Kaizen, Masaaki Imai
 Management by Stress, Jane Slaughter

Japanese business terms
Lean manufacturing